Olympics Grounds was a baseball grounds located in Washington, D.C. It was home to the Washington Olympics of the National Association in 1871–1872 and home to the short-lived Washington clubs of 1873 and 1875, including the Washington Blue Legs. It is considered a major league ballpark by those who count the NA as a major league.

The ballfield was located at 16th Street NW (east); 17th Street NW (west); and S Street NW (south); about a mile west-southwest of the eventual site of Griffith Stadium. The neighborhood is now a combination of residences and commercial businesses.

Further reading 
 Peter Filichia, Professional Baseball Franchises, Facts on File, 1993.

References

Baseball venues in Washington, D.C.
Defunct baseball venues in the United States